Henrike Lähnemann (born 1968) is a German medievalist and holds the Chair of Medieval German, University of Oxford. She is a Fellow of St Edmund Hall, Oxford.

Career
Lähnemann is the daughter of the theologian , and the granddaughter of the German medievalist  (née Benary) and the archeologist Friedrich Karl Dörner; she grew up in Lüneburg and Nuremberg, Germany. She studied German literature, History of Art and Theology at the University of Bamberg, the University of Edinburgh, Free University of Berlin and University of Göttingen. She completed a PhD at the Universität Bamberg on late medieval didactic literature.

Lähnemann worked at the University of Tübingen, where she gained her Venia legendi in German Philology with a study of the Book of Judith in German medieval literature. She spent a year as a Feodor Lynen Research Fellow at the University of Oxford and a semester as Visiting Professor at the University of Zurich. Between 2006 and 2014 she held the Chair of German Studies at Newcastle University, and was also Head of the German Section in Newcastle's School of Modern Languages. In 2010, the German Research Foundation nominated her for AcademiaNet, the database of profiles of leading women scientists; she also chaired Women in German Studies 2009-2015. In 2015, she was appointed to the Chair of Medieval German Language and Literature at the University of Oxford. 2015-2024, she spends two months a year as a Senior Research Fellow at FRIAS, made possible by co-funding of the Chair by the VolkswagenStiftung, the DAAD, and the University of Freiburg.

Her research focuses on medieval manuscripts, the relationship of text and images and how vernacular and Latin literature are connected, currently mainly in late medieval Northern German convents. At the moment she is  working on a  funded project to edit the letters of the nuns from Lüne (together with Eva Schlotheuber), and the edition of prayer books of the Medingen Convent.

Lähnemann's major topic is the engagement with the Reformation and printing. She brought a new linguistic and interdisciplinary angle to Reformation Studies in Oxford, completing the team of experts - Lyndal Roper and Diarmaid MacCulloch being counted among them. As part of the Translating, Printing, Singing the Reformation project a website providing access to digitized Reformation pamphlets was launched, as well as a blog and podcast documenting the most recent activities of the Reformation team. Furthermore, book printing workshops and new productions of key scenes from the Reformation took place. The political relevance of the project becomes evident in the combination of Reformation and anti-Brexit ideas, but especially in the use of Reformation pamphlets for a protest-Hallelujah in the context of civil resistance in Hong Kong.  

The author Angelika Overath dedicated her novel Sie dreht sich um to Lähnemann.

Research projects
Treasures of the Taylorian. Series One: Reformation Pamphlets
Medingen Manuscripts
The Nuns' Network. Editing the Lüne letters (with Eva Schlotheuber, financed by the Gerda Henkel Stiftung). Film documentation of the project.
Sword of Judith Project
The Renner of Hugo von Trimberg
Jüngerer Sigenot

Selected publications
Lähnemann, H., Schlotheuber, E. et al..: Netzwerke der Nonnen. Edition und Erschließung der Briefsammlung aus Kloster Lüne, vol. 1 , Tübingen 2020: Mohr Siebeck, in press
Lähnemann, H., Jones, H., Keßler M. and Ostermann, C. [ed.]: Martin Luther. Sermon von Ablass und Gnade (Treasures of the Taylorian. Series One: Reformation Pamphlets 2) 2018
Lähnemann, H. Das Erfurter ‘Enchiridion’ in der Goslarer Marktkirchen-Bibliothek, in: Marktkirchen-Bibliothek Goslar. Beiträge zur Erforschung der reformationszeitlichen Sammlung, ed. by Helmut Liersch (2017), pp. 232-243.
Lähnemann H., Jones, H. [ed.]: Martin Luther, Sendbrief vom Dolmetschen (Treasures of the Taylorian. Series One: Reformation Pamphlets 1), 2017. 
Edition und Erschließung der Briefsammlung aus Kloster Lüne (ca. 1460-1555), in: Wolfenbütteler Digitale Editionen. Wolfenbüttel 2016-, online.
Lähnemann H. Der Medinger “Nonnenkrieg” aus der Perspektive der Klosterreform. Geistliche Selbstbehauptung 1479-1554, in: 1517-1545: The Northern Experience. Mysticism, Art and Devotion between Late Medieval and Early Modern, ed. by Kees Scheepers et al., Ons Geestelijk Erf 87 2016, pp. 91-116.Lähnemann, H., Hascher-Burger, U.:  Liturgie und Reform im Kloster Medingen. Edition und Untersuchung des Propst-Handbuchs Oxford, Bodleian Library, MS. Lat. liturg. e. 18 (Spätmittelalter, Humanismus, Reformation 76), Tübingen: Mohr Siebeck 2013.
Lähnemann H. Medinger Nonnen als Schreiberinnen zwischen Reform und Reformation. In: B-J Kruse, ed. Rosenkränze und Seelengärten. Bildung und Frömmigkeit in niedersächsischen Frauenklöstern. Wolfenbüttel: Herzog August Bibliothek, 2013, pp. 37–42, 319-320.
Lähnemann H. Text und Textil. Die beschriebenen Pergamente in den Figurenornaten. In: Klack-Eitzen, C., Haase, W., Weissgraf, T., ed. Heilige Röcke. Kleider für Skulpturen in Kloster Wienhausen. Regensburg: Schnell & Steiner, 2013, pp. 71–78 (79-173).
Lähnemann H. Also do du ok. Andachtsanweisungen in den Medinger Handschriften. In: Brüggen, E; Holznagel, F-J; Coxon, S; Suerbaum, A, ed. Text und Normativität im deutschen Mittelalter. Tübingen: de Gruyter, 2012, pp. 437–453.
Lähnemann H. Der Auferstandene im Dialog mit den Frauen. Die Erscheinungen Christi in den Andachtsbüchern des Klosters Medingen. In: Koldau, L.M, ed. Passion und Ostern in den Lüneburger Klöstern. Ebstorf: Verlag Kloster Ebstorf, 2010, pp. 105–134.
Brine K, Ciletti E, Lähnemann H, ed. The Sword of Judith. Judith Studies Across the Disciplines. Cambridge, UK: Open Book Publishers, 2010.
Lähnemann H. Per organa. Musikalische Unterweisung in Handschriften der Lüneburger Klöster. In: Lähnemann, H., Linden, S, ed. Dichtung und Didaxe. Lehrhaftes Sprechen in der deutschen Literatur des Mittelalters. Berlin / New York: Walter de Gruyter, 2009, pp. 397–412.
Lähnemann H., Linden S, ed. Dichtung und Didaxe. Lehrhaftes Sprechen in der deutschen Literatur des Mittelalters. Berlin / New York: de Gruyter, 2009.
Lähnemann H. Hystoria Judith: Deutsche Judithdichtungen vom 12. bis zum 16. Jahrhundert. Berlin: Walter de Gruyter, 2006.
Lähnemann H. 'An dessen bom wil ik stighen.' Die Ikonographie des Wichmannsburger Antependiums im Kontext der Medinger Handschriften. Oxford German Studies 2005, 34(1), 19-46.

References

External links
 
 Personal Homepage
 Henrike Lähnemann on Twitter
 Henrike Lähnemann on Pinterest

Living people
1968 births
German medievalists
Academics of Newcastle University
Statutory Professors of the University of Oxford
Fellows of St Edmund Hall, Oxford
People from Münster